Raymond Griffith (January 23, 1895 – November 25, 1957) was an American silent movie comedian. Later in his career, he worked behind the camera as writer and producer.

Biography
Griffith was born in Boston, Massachusetts. He lost his voice at an early age, causing him to speak for the rest of his life in a hoarse whisper. Griffith claimed that it was the result of his having to scream at the top of his lungs every night in a stage melodrama as a child actor—others have stated that a childhood disease was more likely the cause. Lying about his age, Griffith enlisted in the U.S. Navy at age 15 and served for three years. He was later drafted for service in World War I but was not inducted because of his vocal problems.

Although a few comedy films of his are considered classics he is almost totally forgotten today. His film debut was for the L-KO Kompany. Many of his starring feature films have long since been lost, but probably the best known of his films today is Hands Up! (1926), a Civil War comedy feature directed by Clarence G. Badger, and co-starring Mack Swain, which was entered into the National Film Registry in 2005. Also considered a classic is Badger's Paths to Paradise, a caper film that is in all circulating prints missing its final reel. Like many silent comedians, he had a traditional costume; his was a top hat, white tie and tails, often augmented by a cape and/or walking stick.

The coming of sound ended Griffith's acting career, but he did have one memorable role in a motion picture before retiring from the screen, playing a French soldier killed by Lew Ayres in the 1930 Lewis Milestone film All Quiet on the Western Front. He then segued into a writing/producing career at Twentieth Century Fox.

Griffith choked to death at the Masquers Club in Los Angeles, California, aged 62, on November 25, 1957.

Filmography

References

External links

Classic Images article on Raymond Griffith

1895 births
1957 deaths
Silent film comedians
American male comedians
American male silent film actors
Male actors from Boston
Male actors from Los Angeles
Burials at Forest Lawn Memorial Park (Glendale)
20th-century American male actors
Deaths from choking
American male child actors
Comedians from California
20th-century American comedians
American male comedy actors